Irena do domu! ( Irene, Go Home!) is a 1955 Polish comedy film directed by Jan Fethke.

Cast 
 Lidia Wysocka − Irena Majewska
 Adolf Dymsza − Zygmunt Majewski
 Michał Kiliński − Janek Majewski, their son
 Helena Buczyńska − Nowakowa
 Ludwik Sempoliński − Kotowski
 Hanka Bielicka − Kwiatkowska
 Kazimierz Brusikiewicz − Miecio
 Maria Koterbska − singer
 Zofia Perczyńska − Krystyna
 Włodzimierz Skoczylas − Władek
 Bronisław Darski − Banasik
 Michał Gazda
 Stanisław Jaworski
 Irena Brodzińska
 Urszula Hałacińska
 Barbara Jakubowska
 Irena Skwierczyńska
 Stefan Witas
 Stanisław Woliński
 Henryk Hunko
 Stanisław Igar
 Ignacy Machowski
 Tadeusz Schmidt
 Józef Pieracki

External links 
 

1950s Polish-language films
Polish comedy films
Polish black-and-white films
1955 comedy films
1955 films